Strachów may refer to the following places in Poland:
Strachów, Strzelin County in Lower Silesian Voivodeship (south-west Poland)
Strachów, Wrocław County in Lower Silesian Voivodeship (south-west Poland)
Strachów, Łódź Voivodeship (central Poland)
Strachów, Masovian Voivodeship (east-central Poland)